Allocheilos is a genus of flowering plants belonging to the family Gesneriaceae.

Its native range is Southern China.

Species:

Allocheilos cortusiflorum 
Allocheilos guangxiensis

References

Didymocarpoideae
Gesneriaceae genera